Nationality words link to articles with information on the nation's poetry or literature (for instance, Irish or France).

Events

March – at a dinner celebrating Robert Frost's 85th birthday, the critic Lionel Trilling gives some brief remarks about Frost's poetry and "permanently changed the way people think about his subject", according to critic Adam Kirsch. Trilling says that Frost had been long viewed as a folksy, unobjectionable poet, "an articulate Bald Eagle" who gave readers comfortable truths in traditional meter and New England dialect in such schoolbook favorites such as "Stopping by Woods on a Snowy Evening" and "The Road Not Taken"; but was instead was "a terrifying poet" not so much like Longfellow as Sophocles, "who made plain ... the terrible things of human life." Trilling is severely criticized at the time, but his view will become widely accepted in the following decades.
May 18–24 – Nikita Khrushchev, Soviet Union, head of state, in an extemporaneous speech at the Congress of Soviet Writers, calls for indulgence towards "deviationist" writers. At the same conference, the poet Alexis Surkov again condemns writing "hostile to socialist realism and denounces fellow poet Boris Pasternak as acting in a way that is "treacherous and unworthy of a Soviet writer". A liberalizing trend in the state's treatment of its writers is evident. Surkov, the subject of intense criticism himself, resigned from the congress, and at some point in the year attacks against Pasternak ceased.
November 11 – Release in the United States of the short film Pull My Daisy, written and narrated by Jack Kerouac and starring poets of the Beat Generation Allen Ginsberg, Peter Orlovsky and Gregory Corso.
December 8 – "The Poetry Society" episode of Hancock's Half Hour is broadcast on BBC radio, satirizing artistic pretensions.
In the United States, "Those serious new Bohemians, the beatniks, occupied with reading their deliberately undisciplined, protesting verse in night clubs and hotel ballrooms, created more publicity than poetry", wrote Harrison M. Hayford, a professor of American Literature at Northwestern University. "Meanwhile back on the campus, the 'square' poets were turning more and more to a controlled verse, much of it good enough to survive the pointed charge of academicism." Non-beat, off-campus poets almost routinely displayed "simple competence in the handling of complex forms", he wrote in Encyclopædia Britannica's Britannica Book of the Year 1960, which covered 1959.
Literary critic M.L. Rosenthal coins the term "confessional" as used in Confessional poetry in "Poetry as Confession", an article appearing in the September 19 issue of The Nation. Rosenthal's article reviewed the poetry collection Life Studies by Robert Lowell. The review was later collected in Rosenthal's book of selected essays and reviews, Our Life In Poetry, published in 1991
The chairmanship of The Group, a grouping of British poets, passes to Edward Lucie-Smith this year when Philip Hobsbaum left London to study in Sheffield. The meetings continue at his house in Chelsea, and the circle of poets expands to include Fleur Adcock, Taner Baybars, Edwin Brock, and Zulfikar Ghose; others including Nathaniel Tarn circulate poems for comment.
Carl Sandburg, poet and historian, lectures at the U.S. fair and exposition in Moscow.
After twenty years, John Crowe Ransom steps down as editor of The Kenyon Review, which he founded.
The journal Canadian Literature is founded by George Woodcock at the University of British Columbia.
The British poetry magazine Agenda is founded by William Cookson and Ezra Pound.
Aldous Huxley turns down the offer of a knighthood.
In France, the centenary of the death of Marceline Desbordes-Valmore is commemorated.

Works published in English
Listed by nation where the work was first published and again by the poet's native land, if different; substantially revised works listed separately:

Canada
Ronald Bates, The Wandering World
Ralph Gustafson, The Penguin Book of Canadian Verse, anthology 
Robert Finch, Acis in Oxford and Other Poems. Governor General's Award 1961.
George Johnston, The Cruising Auk
Irving Layton:
A Red Carpet for the Sun,. Governor General's Award 1959.
Laughter in the Mind
Jay Macpherson, *A Dry Light & The Dark Air. Toronto: Hawkshead Press.

India, in English
Nissim Ezekiel, The Third ( Poetry in English ), Bombay: Strand Bookshop;
Keshav Malik, The Lake Surface and Other Poems ( Poetry in English ), New Delhi: Surge Publications
K. P. Budhey, Chant and Incense, Nagpur: Kusum Budhey
Prithwindra N. Mukherjee, A Rose-Bud's Song ( Poetry in English ), Pondicherry: Sri Aurobindo Ashram
P. Lal and K. Raghavendra Rao, editors, Anglo-Indian Poetry, anthology, Delhi: Kavita

United Kingdom
Patricia Beer, The Loss of the Magyar, a first book of poems
Edwin Bronk, An Attempt at Exorcism, Northwood, Middlesex: Scorpion Press
George Mackay Brown, Loaves and Fishes
Robert Graves, Collected Poems, the fourth version
James Harrison, Catchment Area, a first book of poems 
Geoffrey Hill, For the Unfallen: Poems 1952–1958
P. J. Kavanagh, For the Unfallen
Laurence Lerner, Domestic Interior, a first book of poems 
Christopher Logue, Songs
Louis MacNeice, Eighty-Five Poems
James Michie, Possible Laughter, a first book of poems 
Spike Milligan, Silly Verse for Kids (including "On the Ning Nang Nong")
I. A. Richards, Goodbye Earth, a first book of poems by a longtime critic
Anne Ridler, A Matter of Life and Death
Rex Taylor, Poems, a first book of poems
Vernon Watkins, Cypress and Acacia

Anthologies in the United Kingdom
Edwin Muir, editor, New Poets 1959, an anthology including work by Iain Crichton Smith, Karen Gershon and Christopher Levenson
Guy Butler, A Book of South African Verse

United States
W. H. Auden, Selected Poetry
Joseph Payne Brennan, The Dark Returners (collects a handful of poems as filler to the short fiction)
Hayden Carruth, the Crow and the Heart, New York: Macmillan
Louis O. Coxe, The Wilderness, and Other Poems
Babette Deutsch, Coming of Age
Robert Duncan, Selected Poems, San Francisco: City Lights Books
William Everson (also known as "Brother Antoninus"), The Crooked Lines of God, University of Detroit Press
John Fandel, Testament, and Other Poems
Jean Garrigue, A Water Walk by Villa d'Este
Barbara Gibbs, The Green Chapel
Allen Ginsberg, Kaddish, written about his mentally-ill mother
Ramon Guthrie, graffiti, New York: Macmillan
Donald Hall, Dark Houses
Edwin Honig, The Gazebos: Forty-One Poems, Clarke & Way
Barbara Howes, Light and Dark
Langston Hughes, Selected Poems
Jack Kerouac, Mexico City Blues
Kenneth Koch, Ko, or a Season on Earth
Denise Levertov, With Eyes at the Back of Our Heads, New York: New Directions
Robert Lowell, Life Studies, a book on his family and on his own life that reflected stylistic changes that seemed more in line with the popular openness of Beat and Confessional poetry
James Merrill, The Country of a Thousand Years of Peace, and Other Poems
W. S. Merwin, translation, The Poem of the Cid, London: Dent (American edition, 1962, New York: New American Library)
Marianne Moore, O to Be a Dragon
Vladimir Nabokov, Poems
Ogden Nash, Verses from 1929 On
Ned O'Gorman, The Night of the Hammer
Hyam Plutzik, Apples From Shinar
Ezra Pound, Thrones: 96–109 de los cantares
Charles Reznikoff, Inscriptions: 1944-1956, self-published
Theodore Roethke, Words for the Wind
Delmore Schwartz, Summer Knowledge: New and Selected Poems 1938-1958, Garden City, New York: Doubleday
Louis Simpson, A Dream of Governors, Middletown, Connecticut: Wesleyan University Press
W. D. Snodgrass, Heart's Needle
Gary Snyder, Riprap
Ruth Stone, In an Iridescent Time, New York, New York: Harcourt, Brace and Company
May Swenson, A Cage of Spines
David Wagoner, A Place to Stand
Reed Whittemore, The Self-Made Man
Richard Wilbur, Advice to a Prophet and Other Poems, New York: Reynal and Hitchcock
James Wright,  Saint Judas, Middletown, Connecticut: Wesleyan University Press
Louis Zukofsky, A 1–12, published by Cid Corman's Origin Press

Criticism, scholarship and biography in the United States
Richard Ellmann, James Joyce, biography, winner of the National Book Award in 1960
Hugh Kenner (Canadian writing and published in the United States):
The Art of Poetry, criticism
The Invisible Poet: T. S. Eliot (revised edition in 1969), criticism

Other in English
Frank Collymore, Collected Poems, Barbados
M. K. Joseph, The Living Countries, New Zealand
E. H. McCormick, New Zealand Literature, a Survey, acholarship, New Zealand
Chris Wallace-Crabbe, The Music of Division, Sydney: Angus & Robertson, Australia

Works published in other languages
Listed by language and often by nation where the work was first published and again by the poet's native land, if different; substantially revised works listed separately:

French language

France
Louis Aragon, Elsa
Yves Bonnefoy, L'Improbable
Aimé Césaire, Ferrements, Martinique poet published in France
Edmond Jabès, Je batis ma demeure, poemès 1943–1957
Michel Deguy, Meurtrières
Patrice de La Tour du Pin, Le Second Jeu
Henri Michaux, Paix dans les brisements, about his experiences taking mescaline
Saint-John Perse, Chronique, Marseilles: Cahiers du Sud
Boris Vian, Je voudrais crever

Anthologies in France
Roger Caillois and Jean Clarence Lambert, editors, 
Max Pol Fouchet, 
Paul Valéry wrote the preface to the new edition this year of

Les poèmes de l'année 1959
Alain Bosquet and Pierre Seghers, editors, Les poèmes de l'année 1959, with poems by:

Pierre Albert-Birot
Marc Alyn
Guy d'Areangues
Anne-Marie de Backer
Luc Bérimont
Yves Bonnefoy
Roland Bouheret
Pierre Boujut
Hélène Cadou
Jean Cassou
René Char
Paul Chaulot
Malcolm de Chazal
Andrée Chedid
Georges-Emmanuel Clancier
Jean Cocteau
Gabriel Cousin

Yanette Delétang-Tardif
Lucienne Desnoues
Gabriel Dheur
Charles Dobzynski
Marie-Jeanne Durry
Louis Émié
Pierre Emmanuel
Jean Follain
André Frénaud
Jacqueline Frédéric Frié
Pierre Garnier
Gherasim Luca
Paul Gilson
Robert Goffin
Jean Grosjean
Guillevic
George Haldas

Anne Hébert
Alain Jouffroy
Pierre Jean Jouve
Hubert Juin
Anne-Marie Kegels
Jean-Clarence Lambert
Léna Leclercq
Jean Lurçat
Joyce Mansour
Pierre Mathias
Rouben Melik
Victor Misrahi
Bernard Noël
Norge (poet)
Pierre Oster
Pericle Patocchi
Jean-Guy Pilon

Francis Ponge
Gérard Prévot
Jean-Claude Renard
Jean Rousselot
Jacques-André Saintonge
Pierrette Sartin
Lucien Scheler
Léopold Sedar Senghor
Claude Sernet
Jules Supervielle
Jean Tardieu
Tchicaya U Tam'si
Jean Todrani
Jean Tortel
Tristan Tzara
Angèle Vannier

Criticism, scholarship and biography in France
 (1862–1871)

Canada
Maurice Beaulieu, Il fait clair de glaise
Olivier Marchand, Crier que je vis
Fernand Ouellet, Séquences de l'Aile

Criticism, scholarship and biography in French Canada
Editor not known, La Poésie et nous, a collection of essays on poetry

Hebrew

Israel
L. Ben-Amitai, Ahaliba
Leah Goldberg, Mukdam Umeuhar ("Early and Late")
Abraham Halfi, ka-Almonin ba-Geshem ("As the Unknown in the Rain")
Yeshurun Keshet, Hayim Genuzim ("Hidden Life")
Shimshon Meltzer, Or Zorua, ("Scattered Light")
Yonathan Ratush, Zela
Zalmen Shneur, a 10-volume collection of his poems

United States
M. S. Ben-Meir, Zel Utzlil ("Shadow and Sound"), posthumous
A. S. Schwartz, Shirim ("Poems"), posthumous

India
Listed in alphabetical order by first name:
Agyeya (pen name of Sachchidananda Vatsyayan), editor, Teesra Saptak, an anthology of seven poets, including Kunwar Narain), Bhratiya Jnanpith, ; Hindi-language
Harumal Isardas Sadarangani, Ruba'ivun; Sindhi-language
M. Gopalakrishna Adiga, Bhumigita; Kannada-language

Italian
Maria Luisa Spaziani, Luna lombarda

Anthologies in Italy
Editor not known, Nuovi poeti, an anthology of Italian poetry since 1945
Salvatore Quasimodo, editor, Poesia italiana del dopoguerra, an anthology of Italian poetry since 1945

Spanish language

Latin America
Santos Chocano, Poesía de Santos Chocano
Rafael Maya, Navegación nocturna
Pablo Neruda, Estravagario (Chile)
Octavio Paz, La estación violenta
Valdelomar, Obra poética

Anthologies in Latin America
P. Félix Restrepo, prologue and epilogue, Poemas de Colombia, published by the Colombian Academy, with biographical notes by Carlos López Narváez
Antonio de Undurraga, editor, Atlas de la poesía de Chile, including poetry from Guillermo Blest Gana and Luis Merino Reyes

Criticism, scholarship and biography in Latin America
Raúl Leiva, Imagen de la poesía mexicana contemporánea, concerning 29 poets

Spain
Gabriel Celaya, Cantata en Aleixandre, verse variations on themes of Vicente Aleixandre, published as a book by the literary magazine Papeles de sSon Armadans

Yiddish
B. Y. Bialostotsky, a book of poetry
M. Daych, a book of poetry
E. Korman, a book of poetry
H. Leyvik, Lider tsum eybikn ("Songs to the Eternal")
Efrayim Oyerbakh, a book of poetry
Y. Tsvi Shargel, a book of poetry

Other
Mário Cesariny, Nobilíssima Visão (Portugal)
Odysseus Elytis, To Axion Esti — It Is Worthy (Greece)

Awards and honors

United Kingdom
Queen's Gold Medal for Poetry: Francis Cornford

United States
Consultant in Poetry to the Library of Congress (later the post would be called "Poet Laureate Consultant in Poetry to the Library of Congress"): Richard Eberhart appointed this year.
National Book Award for Poetry: Theodore Roethke, Words for the Wind
Pulitzer Prize for Poetry: Stanley Kunitz, Selected Poems 1928-1958
Bollingen Prize: Theodore Roethke
Fellowship of the Academy of American Poets: Louise Bogan

Other
Premio de la Crítica in poetry (Spain): Blas de Otero
Canada: Governor General's Award, poetry or drama: Red Carpet for the Sun, Irving Layton.

Births
Death years link to the corresponding "[year] in poetry" article:
June – Robin Llwyd ab Owain, Welsh poet
June 25 – Barbara Rosiek, Polish writer, poet and clinical psychologist (died 2020)
July 23 – Carl Phillips, American writer and poet
October 1 – Brian P. Cleary, American humorist, poet and author
August 9 – Kim Bridgford, American poet (died 2020)
September 29 – Jon Fosse, Norwegian fiction writer, playwright and poet
Also:
Dermot Bolger, Irish author, playwright and poet
Robert Crawford, Scottish poet and literary scholar
Peter Gizzi, American poet
Paul Henry, Welsh poet
Gwyneth Lewis, Welsh poet
Laura Lush, Canadian poet

Deaths
Birth years link to the corresponding "[year] in poetry" article:
January 3 – Edwin Muir, 72 (born 1887), Scottish poet, novelist and translator
February 20 – Zalman Shneur, 72, Hebrew-Yiddish poet and author
February 23 – Luis Palés Matos, Puerto Rican poet, of a heart attack
April 4 – Sarah Cleghorn, American reformer and poet, 83
April 8 – Kyoshi Takahama 高浜 虚子, pen name of Kiyoshi Takahama (born 1874), Japanese, Shōwa period poet; close disciple of Masaoka Shiki
June 2 – Orelia Key Bell, 95, American poet
June 9 – Ryuko Kawaji 川路柳虹, pen-name of Kawaki Makoto (born 1888), Japanese, Shōwa period poet and literary critic
June 23 – Boris Vian, 39, French writer, poet, singer and musician
July 6 – George Grosz (born 1893), German artist and poet, died from falling down a flight of stairs after a night drinking
August 5 – Edgar Guest, 79, American poet known as the "poet of the people"
August 21 – Denis Devlin (born 1908) Irish modernist poet and career diplomat
September 16 – Roger-Arnould Rivière, 29, French poet, suicide
September 18 – Benjamin Péret, 60, French poet and Surrealist
December 27 – Alfonso Reyes, 70, Mexican poet, and writer

See also

Poetry
List of poetry awards
List of years in poetry

Notes

20th-century poetry
Poetry